Madikai  is a GramaPanchayath in Kasaragod in the state of Kerala.The largest Junction in Madikai Panchayath is Kanhirapoil and Erikkulam. Ambalathara chalakkadav Bangalam are next largest

Demographics
 India census, Madikai had a population of 11446 with 5443 males and 6003 females.

Transportation
Local roads have access to NH.66 which connects to Mangalore in the north and Kannur in the south. The 2 nearest railway stations are Kanhangad & Nileshwar in Mangalore - palakkad line. There are 2 international airport, in north - Mangalore and in South Kannur

References

Nileshwaram area